Dao, officially the Municipality of Dao (Capiznon/Hiligaynon: Banwa sang Dao), is a 4th class municipality in the province of Capiz, Philippines. According to the 2020 census, it has a population of 33,842 people.

History 
Dao was incorporated as a municipality following the founding of Capiz Province in 1901.
It was invaded by the Japanese 41st Infantry Regiment as part of their Panay operation on 16 April 1942. In 1957, the barrio of Nasuli-B was renamed to Santo Tomas.

Geography

Barangays
Dao is politically subdivided into 20 barangays.

Climate

Demographics

Economy

Culture

Attractions
Dao has sites that are well known among natives and are tourist spots alike. These include:

 Sto. Tomas de Villanueva - local parish church
 Lolets Eco Park - a natural park with a resort

Festivities
The people of Dao celebrate festivals, sometimes along with other regions of the province, in events like:

 Pasalamat Festival
 Halaran Festival, although mostly held in Roxas City

Notable personalities

 Jocelyn Bolante is the son of Salvacion Isada and Vicente Bolante. He is the former Undersecretary of the Department of Agriculture and alleged mastermind of the 2004 Fertilizer Fund Scam.  However, in a decision promulgated by the Supreme Court on April 17, 2017, he was acquitted on the ground of insufficiency of evidence and it was found out that he was not a member of the Board of Trustees of LIVECOR for 14 months before the latter even made the initial transaction, which was the subject of the suspicious transaction reports.  Furthermore, according to the Audit Report submitted by the Commission on Audit, no part of the Php 728 million fertilizer fund was ever released to the LIVECOR. The accusations made against him is considered as a political humiliation by the Aquino administration.

References

External links
 [ Philippine Standard Geographic Code]
Philippine Census Information

Municipalities of Capiz